Venkate Gowda Gopala Gowda (born 6 October 1951) is a retired judge of the Supreme Court of India. A former Chief Justice of Orissa High Court.

References

1951 births
Living people
Justices of the Supreme Court of India
Chief Justices of the Orissa High Court
People from Chikkaballapur district
20th-century Indian judges
21st-century Indian judges